The Paraguay national basketball team is the team governed by the Paraguayan Basketball Federation that represents Paraguay in the men's international basketball competitions organized by the International Basketball Federation (FIBA) and the International Olympic Committee (IOC).

The best achievements by the Paraguay men's national basketball team are the two second-places finishes in the FIBA South America Basketball Championship, in 1955 and 1960.

Roster
Team for the 2016 South American Basketball Championship.

Depth chart

Notable players
Other notable players from Paraguay:

Competitions

Olympic Games
 Never competed

FIBA World Cup

FIBA AmeriCup

Pan American Games
 1951: 7th

Results and Fixtures

Recent and forthcoming matches

Head coach position
 Arturo Alvarez – 2010-2012
 Ariel Rearte – 2013-2016
 Eduardo Pfleger - 2016–present

Kit

Sponsor
2013: Itaú
2016: Tigo

See also
 Paraguay women's national basketball team
 Paraguay national under-19 basketball team
 Paraguay national under-17 basketball team
 Paraguay national 3x3 team

References

External links
Official website
FIBA Profile
Paraguay Basketball Records at FIBA Archive
Latinbasket - Paraguay Men National Team

Basketball in Paraguay
Basketball teams in Paraguay
Men's national basketball teams
B
1947 establishments in Paraguay